Kirkcaldy railway station is a former railway station in the western Adelaide suburb of Henley Beach.

History 

The station opened in 1894 on the former Henley Beach railway line and was located on Military Road, immediately south of Grange Road. Facilities consisted of a single platform and a shelter shed.

It was closed on 31 August 1957 because of dangerous conditions caused by vehicles on Military Road. The station has since been demolished.

See also 
 List of closed Adelaide railway stations

References

Disused railway stations in South Australia
Railway stations in Australia opened in 1894
Railway stations closed in 1957
Demolished buildings and structures in South Australia
Demolished railway stations